The 2017 CS Finlandia Trophy was a senior international figure skating competition held in October 2017 in Espoo. It was part of the 2017–18 ISU Challenger Series. Medals were awarded in the disciplines of men's singles, ladies' singles, pair skating, and ice dance.

Entries 
The International Skating Union published the full preliminary list of entries on 5 September 2017.

Results

Men

Ladies

Pairs

Ice dance

Synchronized skating

References

Citations

External links 
 
 2017 CS Finlandia Trophy at the International Skating Union
 Results

CS Finlandia Trophy
2017 in Finnish sport